More Places Forever is the third studio album by experimental singer-songwriter David Thomas, released in May 1985 by Rough Trade Records. In 1997, the album was remastered by Paul Hamann and David Thomas for its inclusion in the Monster anthology box set.

Track listing

Personnel
Adapted from the More Places Forever liner notes.

Musicians
 Lindsay Cooper – bassoon, oboe, alto saxophone, sopranino saxophone, tuba, piano, organ
 Chris Cutler – drums
 Tony Maimone – bass guitar, piano (B2)
 David Thomas – lead vocals, production

Production and additional personnel
 Paul Hamann – engineering, mixing

Release history

References

External links 
 

David Thomas (musician) albums
1985 albums
Rough Trade Records albums
Twin/Tone Records albums